Recover is the second full-length album by American metalcore band Confide, released on May 18, 2010 via Tragic Hero Records.

Background
The album was recorded in the Winter of 2009 at The Foundation Studios by Joey Sturgis. Recover was the band's last album before disbanding in November 2010, but they reformed in late 2012 and independently released a third album in 2013. Recover was also the debut album of lead guitarist Joshua Paul, bassist Trevor Vickers (ex-Underneath the Gun) and drummer Joel Piper.

Track listing

Personnel
Confide
Ross Michael Kenyon - lead vocals
Jeffrey Helberg - rhythm guitar
Joshua Paul - lead guitar
Trevor Vickers - bass
Joel Piper - drums, clean vocals, keyboards, programming

Production
Produced, Engineered, Mixed, Mastered and additional programming by Joey Sturgis
Co-produced, Engineered by Tom Denney
Management by Eric Rushing and Judi Padilla (The Artery Foundation)
Artwork and layout by Devotion Designs
Painting by Ryan Carr
Photography by Celina Kenyon

Additional notes
All lyrics written by Kenyon and Piper
Brandon Wronski - guest vocals on "Tell Me I'm Not Alone"
Tom Denney - co-writing on "The View from My Eyes", "Now Or Never" and "Barely Breathing"
William «Billy» Pruden - co-writing
Album is dedicated to Stewart Teggart, 1966 - 2010.

References

2010 albums
Confide (band) albums
Tragic Hero Records albums
Albums produced by Joey Sturgis
Albums produced by Tom Denney